The 2021 Mid-Eastern Athletic Conference softball tournament was held at the NSU Softball Field on the campus of the Norfolk State University in Norfolk, Virginia from May 13 through May 15, 2021. The tournament was won by the Morgan State Bears, who earned the Mid-Eastern Athletic Conference's automatic bid to the 2021 NCAA Division I softball tournament

Tournament

Bracket

References

Mid-Eastern Athletic Conference softball tournament
Mid-Eastern Athletic Conference softball tournament
Tournament